Up is a 2009 American computer-animated film directed by Pete Docter, who wrote the script with Bob Peterson. It stars the voices of Ed Asner, Christopher Plummer, Jordan Nagai, and Peterson. The film centers on elderly widower Carl Fredricksen (Asner) and Wilderness Explorer Russell (Nagai), who go on a journey to South America in order to fulfill a promise that Carl made to his late wife Ellie. Along the way, they meet a talking dog named Dug (Peterson), and encounter a giant bird named Kevin, who is being hunted by the explorer Charles Muntz (Plummer).

Up debuted at the 62nd Cannes Film Festival on May 13, 2009, and was released in theaters in the United States on May 29. It earned $735million worldwide, making it the sixth highest-grossing film of 2009. On the review aggregator website Rotten Tomatoes, Up holds an approval rating of  based on  reviews.

Up garnered various awards and nominations, most of them in the Best Animated Picture and Best Music categories, the latter composed by Michael Giacchino. Up was nominated for five Academy Awards at the 2010 ceremony, winning two: Best Animated Feature and Best Original Score. It was the second fully-animated film to be nominated for the Academy Award for Best Picture; the first being Beauty and the Beast (1991). Up became the third consecutive Pixar film to win the Academy Award for Animated Feature, after Ratatouille (2007) and WALL-E (2008). The film also won the Golden Globe for Best Animated Feature Film and Best Original Score at the 67th Golden Globe Awards. Up received nine nominations for the Annie Awards in eight categories, winning Best Animated Feature and Best Directing in a Feature Production. It also was selected as the Summer Movie Comedy at the 2009 Teen Choice Awards, and received three Grammy Award nominations at 52nd Grammy Awards, winning two. Rivera received the Producer of the Year Award at the Producers Guild of America Awards, while Docter, Peterson and Giacchino were honored with British Academy of Film and Television Arts (BAFTA) awards for their work on the film.

Accolades

References

External links
 

Up
Up
Up (2009 film)